Nickolaus (also "Nikolaus") "Mickey" (also "Micki") Hirschl (March 20, 1906 – October 10, 1991) was an Austrian Olympic-medal-winning wrestler. He was also a European heavyweight wrestling champion, and for 10 years held the title of Austrian heavyweight wrestling champion.  He was also an Austrian shot put and discus junior champion, Austrian heavyweight weightlifting junior champion, and for seven years the Austrian pentathlon champion.

Early life
Hirschl was Jewish, and was born in Vienna, Austria.  His parents were kosher butchers, and his father was president of a synagogue.

Sports career
At 15 years of age, he won the Austrian junior championship in shot put and discus.  At 16 years of age, he won the Austrian junior championship in heavyweight weightlifting.  

At 17 years of age, he became the pentathlon champion of Austria, winning the title in 1923. He held it for seven years.

At the age of 18, he won the Austrian heavyweight wrestling championship.  He was the Austrian champion for the following 10 years.  In 1932, Hirschl won the gold medal in the European Wrestling Championships heavyweight championship.  He wrestled for the Hakoah Vienna wrestling team, which won 127 international titles from 1929 to 1934.

At the 1932 Olympics in Los Angeles, he won a bronze medal in heavyweight freestyle, and a bronze medal in heavyweight Greco-Roman.

At the 1932 Maccabiah Games in Mandatory Palestine, he won a gold medal in Greco-Roman wrestling in the heavyweight category.

In 1936, he boycotted the Olympics which were to be held in Berlin, Nazi Germany, refusing to participate due to the racial policies of the Nazis.

Life after sports career
Hirschl left Austria to escape the Nazis before the start of World War II.  Most of his family was killed in the Holocaust.

He first moved to pre-Israel Palestine. He joined the British Commandos, and served fighting the Germans in North Africa. After the war, he married and moved to Australia in 1947, where he ran a meat business.

He was inducted into the International Jewish Sports Hall of Fame in 1993.

See also
List of select Jewish wrestlers
List of Olympic medalists in Greco-Roman wrestling
List of 1932 Summer Olympics medal winners

References

Further reading
 Persson, Gunnar; translated by Mirja ItkonenHakoah: tähdet paossa (Hakoah – Exiled Stars), Like, 2006. 

1906 births
1991 deaths
Athletes from Vienna
Austrian emigrants to Mandatory Palestine
Austrian male shot putters
Austrian male discus throwers
Austrian pentathletes
Austrian Jews
Austrian weightlifters
Austrian male sport wrestlers
British Army Commandos soldiers
Jewish male athletes (track and field)
Jewish weightlifters
Jewish wrestlers
Jews who emigrated to escape Nazism
Maccabiah Games gold medalists
Maccabiah Games medalists in wrestling
Maccabiah Games gold medalists for Austria
Competitors at the 1932 Maccabiah Games
Olympic wrestlers of Austria
Olympic bronze medalists for Austria
Wrestlers at the 1932 Summer Olympics
Medalists at the 1932 Summer Olympics
Sportspeople from Vienna